The Philadelphia Yellow Jackets were a professional indoor football team and a member of the American Indoor Football league that played half a season in 2016 before folding due to financial issues.

In addition to being Philadelphia's second arena/indoor team (after the Philadelphia Soul currently playing in the Arena Football League), the Yellow Jackets were named in honor of (and their visual identity is designed after) Philadelphia's first National Football League team, the Frankford Yellow Jackets.  The original Yellow Jackets played in the NFL from 1924 until 1931 (and notably won the 1926 NFL championship).

History
On June 11, 2015, the AIF announced the Yellow Jackets would be joining for the 2016 season.  The "P-Y-J" are owned by Joe Krause, owner of the Indoor Gridiron League. The Yellow Jackets played their home games at the Class of 1923 Arena on the campus of the University of Pennsylvania the majority of their first season until May 11, 2016, when the university voided their contract for lack of payment leading to cancelling their last three games. Owner Joe Krause released a statement on the team's Facebook account accusing the university of breach of contract while he was dealing with his wife's recovery from a stroke.

They did re-schedule their last "home" game to be at the Pennsylvania Farm Show Complex & Expo Center in Harrisburg, Pennsylvania, however, this game was also never played. The team was removed from the AIF after the 2016 season.

2016 season

Season record

Key:

Preseason
All start times were local to home team

Regular season
All start times were local to home team

Standings

References

External links
Philadelphia Yellow Jackets official website

former American Indoor Football teams
American football teams in Philadelphia
American football teams established in 2015
2015 establishments in Pennsylvania